Making Peace With the Planet is a 1990 book by Barry Commoner.  Commoner argues that, despite billions of dollars spent to save the environment, America is still in a deep environmental crisis. The book argues that environmental pollution can be prevented only through fundamental redesign of the way we produce goods.

References

1990 non-fiction books
1990 in the environment
American political books
Environmental non-fiction books